Rodrigo Pascual Viega Alves (born 7 August 1991) is a Uruguayan footballer who plays as a midfielder for C.A. Progreso in the Uruguayan Primera División.

References

External links
Profile at ESPN FC

1991 births
Living people
Peñarol players
Juventud de Las Piedras players
Club Atlético Temperley footballers
Montevideo Wanderers F.C. players
C.A. Progreso players
Uruguayan Primera División players
Argentine Primera División players
Uruguayan footballers
Uruguayan expatriate footballers
Uruguayan expatriate sportspeople in Argentina
Association football midfielders